The 2010–11 I liga was the 63rd season of the second tier domestic division in the Polish football league system since its establishment in 1949 and the 3rd season of the Polish I liga under its current title. The league was operated by the Polish Football Association (PZPN).

The league is contested by 18 teams who competing for promotion to the 2011–12 Ekstraklasa. The regular season was played in a round-robin tournament. The champions and runners-up would receive promotion. The bottom four teams were automatically demoted to the II liga.

Teams

Relegated from 2009–10 Ekstraklasa:
 Odra Wodzisław
 Piast Gliwice

2009–10 I liga teams remaining in the league:
 Dolcan Ząbki
 Flota Świnoujście
 GKS Katowice
 GKP Gorzów Wielkopolski
 Górnik Łęczna
 KSZO Ostrowiec Świętokrzyski
 ŁKS Łódź
 MKS Kluczbork
 Podbeskidzie Bielsko-Biała
 Pogoń Szczecin
 Sandecja Nowy Sącz
 Warta Poznań

Promoted from 2009–10 II liga:
 Ruch Radzionków
 Górnik Polkowice
 LKS Nieciecza
 Kolejarz Stróże

League table

Season statistics

Top scorers

See also
2010–11 Ekstraklasa
2010–11 Polish Cup

References

External link
 

2010–11 in Polish football
Pol
I liga seasons